Alfaxolone/alfadolone (brand names Althesin (human), Saffan (veterinary) is a short acting intravenous anaesthetic agent. It was withdrawn from the market due to severe drug reactions. It is composed of a 3:1 mixture of alfaxalone and alfadolone, two neurosteroids.

Mechanism
Alfaxolone/alfadolone is short-duration, intravenous anaesthetic made from a combination of two steroidal compounds, alfaxalone and alfadolone of which the former is the primary anaesthetic agent. Alfadolone acts to increase the solubility of the mixture in which it is dissolved, a polyethylated castor oil adjuvant. Anaesthetic efficacy is achieved by allosteric potentiation of the GABAA chloride channel to produce 'fast' synaptic inhibition.

Clinical use

Alfaxolone/alfadolone is short-acting, rapid onset anaesthetic which has been used for out-patient surgery. It does not have significant analgesic properties and anaesthesia has often been maintained with inhalational anaesthetics such as halothane. These have also been accompanied by neuromuscular blockers. Procedures carried out under this drug are greatly varied and have included orthopaedic, gynaecological, dental and urological surgery. Notable effects include a drop in arterial and venous pressure in a quarter of patients; this is accompanied by a compensatory mild tachycardia in around 35% of those observed in a population skewed towards geriatrics.

Cremophor EL (aka. Polyoxyl 35 Castor Oil, a surfactant and derivative of castor oil) was the solubilizing agent (excipient / additive) of Althesin.

A study 2001 found that Cremophor EL, when previously used as a solubilizing agent in lipid emulsions, was responsible for severe anaphylactoid reactions. Drugs using it were reformulated to use other emulsifiers.

Alfaxolone/alfadolone has been re-branded as "Saffan" and is available for use in veterinary anaesthesia.

References 

General anesthetics
Neurosteroids
Combination drugs
GABAA receptor positive allosteric modulators
Pregnanes